Rockbridge Township is one of thirteen townships in Greene County, Illinois, USA.  As of the 2010 census, its population was 1,633 and it contained 761 housing units.

Geography

Cities, towns, villages
 Greenfield (vast majority)
 Rockbridge

Unincorporated towns
 Fayette at 
(This list is based on USGS data and may include former settlements.)

Cemeteries
The township contains these ten cemeteries: Cannedy, Freer, Hudson, Mitchell, Rives, Taylor Creek, Weisner, Whitlock, Witt and Witt Number 1.

Major highways
  U.S. Route 67
  Illinois Route 108

Airports and landing strips
 Sunset Landing Strip

Demographics

School districts
 Greenfield Community Unit School District 10

Political districts
 Illinois' 19th congressional district
 State House District 97
 State Senate District 49

References
 
 United States Census Bureau 2007 TIGER/Line Shapefiles
 United States National Atlas

External links
 City-Data.com
 Illinois State Archives

Townships in Greene County, Illinois
Townships in Illinois